The Voroneț Monastery is a medieval monastery in the Romanian village of Voroneț, now a part of the town Gura Humorului. It is one of the famous painted monasteries from southern Bukovina, in Suceava County. The monastery was constructed by Stephen the Great in 1488 over a period of 3 months and 3 weeks to commemorate the victory at Battle of Vaslui. Often known as the "Sistine Chapel of the East" for its vivid frescoes, Voroneț's walls feature an intense shade of blue known in Romania as "Voroneț blue."

The monastery is located to the south of Gura Humorului in Suceava County, in the valley of the Voroneț River. The legend of the origin of the church unites two men central to Romanian history: the founder of the monastery, Stephen the Great, and Saint Daniil the Hermit, the first abbot of the monastery. The tomb of Saint Daniil is located within the monastery.

The church is one of the Painted churches of Moldavia listed in UNESCO's list of World Heritage Sites.

History
The age of the monastic site is not known. A legend tells us that Stephen the Great, in a moment of crisis during a war against the Ottoman Turks, came to Daniel the Hermit at his skete in Voroneț and asked for advice. Daniel told him not to surrender the fight. Then, after victory, he must build a monastery dedicated to Saint George. The original entrance above the Church of Saint George, now in the exonarthex, bears the inscription:

The church was built on a triconch plan (with three apses), with a chancel, a naos with its tower, and a pronaos.

In 1547, the Metropolitan Bishop of Moldavia Grigorie Roșca added the exonarthex to the west end of the church and had the exterior walls painted. His contribution is recorded on the left of the entrance door:

The monastery contains tombstones commemorating Saint Daniel the Hermit, Grigorie Roșca, and other patrons of the church and noblemen.

Voroneţ was known for its school of calligraphy, where priests, monks and friars learned to read, write and translate religious texts. The school produced two notable copies of Romanian translations of the Bible: The Codex of Voroneț, discovered in 1871, and The Psalter of Voroneț, found in 1882. These books are now held at the Romanian Academy.

The monastery was deserted soon after 1775, when the Habsburg monarchy annexed the northern part of Moldavia. The monastic community returned to Voroneț in 1991. Since their return, those living in the monastery have constructed housing for the resident nuns, a chapel, fountains, stables, barns, and a house for pilgrims.

Church
The katholikon (main church) of Saint George at Voroneț Monastery is possibly the most famous church in Romania. It is known throughout the world for its exterior frescoes of bright and intense colours, and for the hundreds of well-preserved figures placed against the renowned azurite background. The small windows, their rectangular frames of crossed rods and the receding pointed or shouldered arches of the interior doorframes are Gothic. The south and north doors of the exonarthex of 1547 have rectangular frames, which indicate a transition period from Gothic to Renaissance. But, above them, on each wall is a tall window with a flamboyant Gothic arch. The whole west façade is without any openings, which indicates that the intention of the Metropolitan Roșca was from the beginning to reserve it for frescoes.

On the north façade is still visible the original decoration of the church, the rows of ceramic enamelled discs in yellow, brown and green, decorated in relief. These include heraldic motifs, such as the rampant lion and the aurochs' head of the Moldavian coat of arms, and creatures inspired by Western European mediaeval literature, such as two-tailed mermaids. The tower is decorated with sixteen tall niches, in four of which are windows. A row of small niches encircles the tower above them. The fragmented roof probably follows the shape of the original roof, which doubtless was made with shingles.

Images

See also
 List of Romanian Orthodox monasteries
 Churches of Moldavia
 Tourism in Romania 
 Seven Wonders of Romania
 Byzantium after Byzantium

References

Kocój E., Świątynie, postacie, ikony. Malowane cerkwie i monastyry Bukowiny Południowej w wyobrażeniach rumuńskich, Kraków 2006, Wydawnictwo Uniwersytetu Jagiellońskiego, ss. 444, 120 pf, https://www.academia.edu/24331662/%C5%9Awi%C4%85tynie_postacie_ikony._Malowane_cerkwie_i_monastyry_Bukowiny_Po%C5%82udniowej_w_wyobra%C5%BCeniach_rumu%C5%84skich_Temples_persons_icons._Painted_churches_and_monasteries_of_South_Bukovina_in_Romanian_imagology_Wydawnictwo_Uniwersytetu_Jagiello%C5%84skiego_Krak%C3%B3w_2006_s._440

External links

 360° panoramic images from Voroneț Monastery
 Romania's Painted Churches 
 Photos from Romania : Monastery Voroneț
 Photos of Mănăstirea Voroneț
 Voroneț
 The Holy Monastery of Voroneț Romania's National Institute for Research and Development in Informatics
 Bucovina - Treasures and Tranquillity 
 The Voroneț Monastery Rural Tourism in Romania
 Voroneț Monastery

Churches of Moldavia
Churches established by Stephen the Great
Eastern Orthodox pilgrimage sites
1488 establishments in Europe